One person from Peru competed at the 1900 Summer Olympics in Paris.  However, the International Olympic Committee currently does not show Peru as having participated in the 1900 Games.

Results by event

Fencing

Carlos de Candamo competed in two events in 1900, reaching the quarterfinals in the foil and being eliminated in the first round in the épée.

References

Nations at the 1900 Summer Olympics
1900
Olympics
1900 in Peruvian sport